Robert Earl (Bob) Winograd (born June 6, 1950) is a Canadian former professional ice hockey player. He played professionally in the World Hockey Association (WHA), the North American Hockey League and the American Hockey League from 1972 until 1977. Born in Winnipeg, Manitoba, Winograd played junior hockey in his hometown. He then went to college at Colorado College. After one season at college, he was drafted by the St. Louis Blues in the ninth round  (108th overall) of the 1970 NHL Amateur Draft.  After college, he joined the New York Raiders of the WHA for the 1972-73 season. The following season, he played for the New York Golden Blades/Jersey Knights of the WHA as well as several minor league teams. He returned to the WHA for one season in 1976-77 with the San Diego Mariners.

References

External links

1950 births
AHCA Division I men's ice hockey All-Americans
Canadian ice hockey defencemen
Colorado College Tigers men's ice hockey players
Greensboro Generals (SHL) players
Jacksonville Barons players
Living people
Long Island Ducks (ice hockey) players
Jersey Knights players
New York Golden Blades players
New York Raiders players
San Diego Mariners players
Ice hockey people from Winnipeg
St. Louis Blues draft picks
Syracuse Blazers players
Winnipeg Monarchs players
Jewish Canadian sportspeople
Jewish ice hockey players